

Peaks above 6,000 metres

This is a list of the thirty-seven 6000 metre peaks in Peru as defined by a regain height, or prominence, above a col of 300m or more. This list is taken from the full set of Peruvian IGM maps alongside various climbing and mountaineering records. Heights are taken from the Peruvian IGM 1:100,000 series maps with the OEAV survey maps  of the Cordillera Blanca (north and south) used  where the IGM maps do not give spot heights. SRTM data has been used in a few places to confirm these heights, but due to the steep terrain is often unusable

Peaks less than 6000m
Many peaks in Peru frequently quoted as being over 6000m are under this height according to the most recent surveys published by the Peruvian IGM. These peaks include:- Pumasillo 5,991m, Lasunayoc 5,936m, Yanarahu 5,954m, Artesonraju 5,999m, Sabancaya 5,976m, Palumani 5,723m, Sara Sara 5,505m, Helancoma 5,367m.

Sub-peaks with less than 300m re-ascent
Other 6,000 m peaks which are often defined as individual peaks but which have less than 300 m of re-ascent or prominence, include:- Huandoy W 6,342 m (prominence between 200-250m), Sarapu 6,127 (prominence between 180-230m), Callangate North 6,000 m (less than 295m prominence).

Qaras E (6025m) and Rasac (6,017 m) may or may not have 300m prominence. There is insufficient data on the relevant Peruvian IGM maps.

Mountain ranges 
Peru is home to a number of mountain ranges, including the following:

See also
 Geography of Peru

References

 Sources consulted
 

 Endnotes

External links

The lists can be contradictory but are all useful. They use different criteria of prominence or re-ascent for defining major peaks and sub-peaks.
 "The 6000m peaks of the Andes" - a comprehensive, up-to-date and well researched list.
  at Peak Bagger.com – a hypertext list

Peru
Mountains
Peru